Michel Faré (1913–1985) was a French writer and art historian, author of two seminal works on French still life.

Publications 
 Le Grand siècle de la nature morte le XVIIe, Paris, Fribourg, Office du livre, 1974.
 La Vie silencieuse en France, la nature morte au XVIIIe, Paris Fribourg, Office du livre, 1976. In collaboration with his son, Fabrice Faré.

See also 
 List of Académie des Beaux-Arts members: Unattached

References

External links 
 Faré, Michel on Dictionary of art historians

1913 births
1985 deaths
20th-century French writers
French art historians
Winners of the Prix Broquette-Gonin (literature)